Talla may refer to:

People
 Didier Talla (born 1989), Cameroonian football player
 Talla Diaw (born 1954), Senegalese wrestler
 Talla Gnananandam, Indian pastor
 Talla N'Diaye (born 1993), Senegalese football player
 Talla Sylla (born 1966), Senegalese politician

Fictional characters
 Talla Tarly, a character in the Game of Thrones media franchise
 Duane Talla, a preloaded character in The Sims 4: Island Living

Places

Egypt
 Talla, one of the transliterations of Tala, Egypt

Italy
 Talla, Arezzo, Tuscany, Italy

Scotland
 Talla, also known as Inchtalla, island in the Loch or Lake of Menteith, central Scotland
 Talla Castle, Scotland
 Talla Railway, Scotland
 Talla Reservoir, Scotland
 Talla Water, river in Scotland

United States
 Tallabogue (disambiguation), several streams in Mississippi, United States

See also
 Tala (disambiguation)
 Tella, Ethiopian alcoholic beverage